Conrad Abels (January 31, 1856 – February 4, 1942) was a Dutch priest, missionary, and Vicar Apostolic of Jehol. He was a member of the CICM Missionaries.

Biography
Conrad Abels was born in the Netherlands, on January 31, 1856.  He was ordained a priest on March 29, 1879. He came to preach in Inner Mongolia in March 1881. On July 5, 1897, he was appointed Vicar Apostolic of Jehol by the Holy See. In 1900, Conrad Abels and his believers successfully defended the line against repeated Boxer assaults.

On February 4, 1942, he died at the Cathedral, aged 91.

References

1856 births
1942 deaths
19th-century Dutch Roman Catholic priests
20th-century Dutch Roman Catholic priests
20th-century Roman Catholic bishops in China